Suxian Hill also known as the 18th blessed land of China, is located 2 kilometers east of Chenzhou, Hunan, China.
It covers 15 square kilometers.
There are many historical legends associated with it. There are also Taoist relics there.
The Suxian Temple on top of the hill is the main scenic spot.

References

Landforms of Hunan
Hills of China